Vladimir Atoev (born 22 January 1999) is a Russian racing driver.

Career

Karting
Prior to his single-seater career, Atoev enjoyed a successful period in karting, winning the Russian Karting Championship Supermini class in 2009 and finishing second in the KF3 class two years later. Outside of his native Russia, he finished sixth in the KF3 WSK Final Cup in 2012.

Formula 4
Atoev made his single-seater debut in 2014, racing in the French F4 Championship. He finished the season in eleventh place, with a best race result of fourth achieved at both Nogaro and Paul Ricard. He did take victory in the second race of the Nogaro event, but was penalised with a 30-second time penalty for a collision with Belgian driver Max Defourny.

For 2015, Atoev raced in the inaugural SMP F4 Championship. He finished as runner-up in the championship, behind Finnish driver Niko Kari, taking eleven podium positions including three race wins, all of which occurred at the Alastaro Circuit in Finland.

Formula V8 3.5
In 2016, Atoev was set graduate to Formula V8 3.5, racing for the SMP Racing team alongside Matthieu Vaxivière, the championship runner-up from the 2015 Formula Renault 3.5 Series, but was forced to withdraw due to a back injury and was replaced by Matevos Isaakyan.

Racing record

Career summary

Complete Blancpain GT Series Sprint Cup results

References

External links

1999 births
Living people
Sportspeople from Rostov-on-Don
Russian racing drivers
French F4 Championship drivers
SMP F4 Championship drivers
World Series Formula V8 3.5 drivers
Euroformula Open Championship drivers
Russian Circuit Racing Series drivers
SMP Racing drivers
Auto Sport Academy drivers
Koiranen GP drivers
Teo Martín Motorsport drivers
Karting World Championship drivers
Ferrari Challenge drivers